Dog handlers can refer to:

Professional handlers — a person who trains, conditions and shows dogs in professional shows for a fee 
Military or Police handlers — handlers of police dogs